CPT2 may refer to:

 Carnitine palmitoyltransferase II, an important metabolic enzyme. 
 Carnitine palmitoyltransferase II deficiency, a condition that prevents the body from converting certain fats into energy
 Killarney Airport, CPT2 ICAO airport code, located in Killarney, Ontario, Canada